Josué Anunciado de Oliveira, or simply Josué (born 19 July 1979), is a former Brazilian defensive midfielder.

He played for the Brazil national football team from 2007 to 2010, winning the 2007 Copa América and playing at the 2010 FIFA World Cup.

Club career
Josué started his career in Goiás before moving on to São Paulo in 2005. He won the Brazilian League, Copa Libertadores and FIFA Club World Cup during his stint at São Paulo. A resilient defensive midfielder that despite being an infrequent provider of assists or goals, the steel he provided in front of São Paulo's back four helped them claim Brazilian League gold in 2006 and 2007.

He then joined VfL Wolfsburg in August 2007, and captained the team who won the 2008–09 Bundesliga, their first league title. As a result, they played in the 2009–10 UEFA Champions League.

In March 2013 on free transfer after five years at Wolfsburg, Josúe transferred to Atlético Mineiro. On 31 March 2013 in his debut match, he scored his first goal for Atlético in a 4–1 victory over Tupi in the Minas Gerais State Championship.

International career
Josué made his international debut on 27 March 2007 in a friendly match against Ghana. He was also part of the Brazil squad which won the 2007 Copa América. His first international goal came during the tournament, in a match against Chile, which Brazil went on to win 6–1.

Career statistics

Club

International

International goals
 (Brazil score listed first, score column indicates score after each Josué goal)

Honours

Club
Goiás
Campeonato Goiano: 1997, 1998, 1999, 2000, 2002, 2003
Campeonato Brasileiro Série B: 1999
Copa Centro-Oeste: 2000, 2001, 2002

São Paulo
Campeonato Paulista: 2005
Copa Libertadores: 2005
FIFA Club World Cup: 2005
Campeonato Brasileiro Série A: 2006, 2007

Wolfsburg
Bundesliga: 2008–09

Atlético Mineiro
Campeonato Mineiro: 2013, 2015
Copa Libertadores: 2013
Recopa Sudamericana: 2014
Copa do Brasil: 2014

International
Brazil
Copa América: 2007
Confederations Cup: 2009

References

External links
 Josué at kicker.de 

1979 births
Living people
Brazilian footballers
Brazilian expatriate footballers
Brazil international footballers
2007 Copa América players
2009 FIFA Confederations Cup players
2010 FIFA World Cup players
Copa América-winning players
Copa Libertadores-winning players
FIFA Confederations Cup-winning players
Goiás Esporte Clube players
São Paulo FC players
VfL Wolfsburg players
Clube Atlético Mineiro players
Campeonato Brasileiro Série A players
Bundesliga players
Expatriate footballers in Germany
Association football midfielders